Streatham Wells ward is an administrative division of the London Borough of Lambeth, United Kingdom. It contains part of Streatham town centre to the east of the A23  Streatham High Road. The population of the ward at the 2011 Census was 14,906.

Streatham Wells ward is located in the Streatham Parliamentary constituency.

Lambeth Council elections 2018 
The 2018 Lambeth council elections took place on Thursday May 3, 2018 with Labour retaining all 3 seats it gained in 2014.

Lambeth Council elections 2010-14
At the 2010 Lambeth Council elections, residents of Streatham Wells elected three Liberal Democrat councillors.

At the 2014 elections, residents of Streatham Wells elected three Labour Party Councillors, the first time that Labour had won the ward.

Earlier electoral history
From the formation of the London Borough of Lambeth in 1965 to 1990, Streatham Wells elected Conservative councillors.  A single Liberal Democrat councillor was elected in 1990 alongside two Conservatives. From 1994 to 2010, the ward elected three Liberal Democrat councillors.

References

External links
Lambeth Borough Council profile for the ward
Streatham Wells ward election results on Lambeth website

Wards of the London Borough of Lambeth